This is the list of candidates for the 2018 Malaysian general election. All names listed here are expected to contest in 222 parliamentary seats and 505 state seats (from 12 state legislative assemblies).

The parliamentary election deposit was set at RM 10,000 per candidate, double the state election deposit per candidate. Similar to previous elections, the election deposit will be forfeited if the particular candidate had failed to secure at least 12.5% or one-eighth of the votes.

Contesting parties 
24 parties are expected to contest in this election. The table below, however, lists only parties represented in the previous Dewan Rakyat.

The contested parliamentary seats 
A total of 222 parliamentary seats will be contested in the 14th general election.

Perlis (3)

Kedah (15)

Kelantan (14)

Terengganu (8)

Penang (13)

Perak (24)

Pahang (14)

Selangor (22)

Kuala Lumpur (11)

Putrajaya (1)

Negeri Sembilan (8)

Malacca (6)

Johor (26)

Labuan (1)

Sabah (25)

Sarawak (31)

The contested state seats 
A total of 505 seats from 12 state legislative assemblies are contested in the 14th general election.

Perlis (15)

Kedah (36)

Kelantan (45)

Terengganu (32)

Penang (40)

Perak (59)

Pahang (42)

Selangor (56)

Negeri Sembilan (36)

Malacca (28)

Johor (56)

Sabah (60)

Results 
All results were announced before 5 pm, 10 May.

References 

General elections in Malaysia
2018 elections in Malaysia
2018 in Malaysia
Election results in Malaysia
Malaysia